Groos may refer to:

People named:
 David Groos, Canadian politician
 Friedrich Groos, German physician and philosopher
 Gerard de Groos or Jan Adriaen Gerhardt de Groos (died 1730), Czech engraver of the Flemish origine 
 Kaare Steel Groos, Norwegian politician
 Karl Groos, German psychologist
 Margaret Groos, American athlete
 Richard Groos (died 1407), English politician

See also
 Carl W. A. Groos House (New Braunfels, Texas)
 Carl Wilhelm August Groos House (San Antonio, Texas)